The Tabatière rifle was a breech-loading rifle of the French Army.

The Tabatière system was developed from 1864 as a way to convert numerous muzzle-loading weapons (usually Minié rifles) into breech-loading ones, in a process similar to that of the Snider-Enfield in Great Britain or the Springfield Model 1866 in the United States. The name "Tabatière" comes from the fact that the breech-loading mechanism looked like a snuff box.

Most of the conversion work had been accomplished by the time of the Franco-Prussian War. By July 1870, roughly 358,000 rifles had been converted, while 1.4 million muzzleloaders stayed in their original configuration.

The ammunition was a center fire cartridge closely resembling a shortened 12 gauge shotgun shell. This weapon system was recognized as ballistically inferior to the Chassepot rifle, therefore it was used by second line troops and in defensive roles.

These are commonly encountered today as "Zulu Guns", after rifles were converted into shotguns and sold cheaply in the early 1900s.

Models
 Tabatière rifle model 1867.

Users
 : Acquired small amounts during the Paraguayan war. A number were imported from Germany and France by Buenos Aires in 1/6/1800 along with 500.000 cartridges. Those rifles were shipped without bayonets, and were adapted to use old muzzleloader bayonets.

Conflicts
Paraguayan War (Limited)

Argentine Civil Wars

Franco-Prussian War

Notes

Rifles of France
Early rifles
Single-shot rifles
Hinged breechblock rifles